XHBW-FM is a radio station on 93.3 FM in Chihuahua, Chihuahua. It is owned by MegaRadio and carries its Magia Digital format.

History
XEBW-AM on 1280 kHz received its concession on October 14, 1938. Owned by Radio Emisora del Norte, S. de R.L., the station changed concessionaires in 2010 and migrated to FM in 2011.

References

Radio stations in Chihuahua
Mass media in Chihuahua City